Popular mathematics is mathematical presentation aimed at a general audience. Sometimes this is in the form of books which require no mathematical background and in other cases it is in the form of expository articles written by professional mathematicians to reach out to others working in different areas.

Notable works of popular mathematics
Some of the most prolific popularisers of mathematics include Keith Devlin, Rintu Nath, Martin Gardner, and Ian Stewart. Titles by these three authors can be found on their respective pages.

On zero

On infinity
 
 Rucker, Rudy (1982), Infinity and the Mind: The Science and Philosophy of the Infinite; Princeton, N.J.: Princeton University Press. .

On constants

On complex numbers

On the Riemann hypothesis

On recently solved problems

On classification of finite simple groups

On higher dimensions
 Rucker, Rudy (1984), The Fourth Dimension: Toward a Geometry of Higher Reality; Houghton Mifflin Harcourt.

On introduction to mathematics for the general reader

Biographies

Magazines and journals

 Popular science magazines such as New Scientist and Scientific American sometimes carry articles on mathematics.
 Plus Magazine is a free online magazine run under the Millennium Mathematics Project at the University of Cambridge.

The journals listed below can be found in many university libraries.

 American Mathematical Monthly is designed to be accessible to a wide audience.
 The Mathematical Gazette contains letters, book reviews and expositions of attractive areas of mathematics.
 Mathematics Magazine offers lively, readable, and appealing exposition on a wide range of mathematical topics.
 The Mathematical Intelligencer is a mathematical journal that aims at a conversational and scholarly tone.
 Notices of the AMS - Each issue contains one or two expository articles that describe current developments in mathematical research, written by professional mathematicians. The Notices also carries articles on the history of mathematics, mathematics education, and professional issues facing mathematicians, as well as reviews of books, plays, movies, and other artistic and cultural works involving mathematics.

Audio and video 

 Simon Singh's Fermat's Last Theorem is available in audio and there is also a Horizon television program.

Museums
Several museums aim at enhancing public understanding of mathematics:

In the United States:
 Museum of Mathematics, New York, and its predecessor, the Goudreau Museum of Mathematics in Art and Science,

In Austria:
 , Wien

In Germany:
 Arithmeum, Bonn
 Mathematisch-Physikalischer Salon, Dresden
 Mathematikum, Gießen
 , Frankfurt on Main
 , Freiberg
 , Oberwolfach

In Italy:
 The Garden of Archimedes

References

Mathematics and culture
Mathematics literature
Recreational mathematics
Mathematics